Drorah Setel is an American biblical scholar and feminist theologian from Buffalo, New York, who was formerly a rabbi at Temple Beth El in Niagara Falls, NY. She presently serves as rabbi to the Temple Emanu-El congregation at the Jewish Community Center in Brighton, a suburb of Rochester, New York.

A social activist and a spiritual caregiver, Setel is known as a co-writer, with Debbie Friedman, of the "Mi Shebeirach" sung in Reform Jewish communities today. Ellen Umansky has listed Setel as among the most prominent Jewish feminist theologians.

Setel is a divorced mother of three children.

References

Feminist theologians
American biblical scholars
Writers from Buffalo, New York
American Jewish theologians
20th-century American writers
Women Jewish theologians
Living people
Year of birth missing (living people)
Place of birth missing (living people)
21st-century American Jews